Darrough  may refer to:
 John S. Darrough (1841–1920), a Union Army soldier in the American Civil War
 Darrough Chapel, Indiana, an unincorporated town in Center Township, Howard County